Ferreira do Zêzere is a municipality in Santarém District in Portugal. The population in 2011 was 8,619, in an area of 190.38 km². The municipal holiday is June 13.

Parishes
Administratively, the municipality is divided into 7 civil parishes (freguesias):
 Águas Belas
 Areias e Pias
 Beco
 Chãos
 Ferreira do Zêzere
 Igreja Nova do Sobral
 Nossa Senhora do Pranto

History

This old village, founded by Pedro Ferreira and his wife in the 13th century is actually one of the most touristic villages in the district of Santarém. In the surroundings of Ferreira do Zêzere there is the medieval Vila de Dornes with an excellent view over the Zêzere River and a classified Templar Tower.

References

External links
Notícias do Zêzere
Ferreiradigital.com
Town Hall official website
Photos from Ferreira do Zêzere

Towns in Portugal
Populated places in Santarém District
Municipalities of Santarém District